The  Gesta Hunnorum et Hungarorum (Latin: "Deeds of the Huns and Hungarians") is a medieval chronicle written mainly by Simon of Kéza around 1282–1285. It is one of the sources of early Hungarian history. It is also known as the Gesta Hungarorum (II) (Latin: "Deeds of the Hungarians"), the "(II)" indicating its status as an expansion of the original Gesta Hungarorum (written around 1200).

The work is dated to 1282–1285 as it includes the Battle of Lake Hód (1282) but does not mention the Second Mongol invasion of Hungary in 1285.

The work combines Hunnish legend with history. It consists of two parts: the Hunnish legend ("Hunnish Chronicle"), expanded with Hungarian oral tales; and a history of the Kingdom of Hungary since the original Gesta Hungaronum.

Simon of Kéza was a court cleric of King Ladislaus IV of Hungary (reigned 1272–1290). He travelled widely in Italy, France and Germany and culled his epic and poetic materials from a broad range of readings.

By Kéza's own admission, he used contemporary German, Italian and French chronicles, but it has been proved that he freely used Hungarian sources also.

The Gesta Hunnorum et Hungarorum was edited and translated in 1999 by László Veszprémy and Frank Schaer for the Central European University.

See also 

 Gesta Hungarorum
 Chronicon Pictum
 Chronica Hungarorum
Hungarian prehistory
Hunor and Magor
 Seven chieftains of the Magyars
 Turul
 Árpád dynasty
 Principality of Hungary
 Kingdom of Hungary (1000–1301)

Sources

External links
Hungarian translation of Simon's Gesta 
Article about Simon of Kéza and the Gesta Hunnorum et Hungarorum 

Hungarian chronicles
13th-century history books
13th-century Latin books